Conchita Martínez was the defending champion but lost in the quarterfinals to Jennifer Capriati.

Amélie Mauresmo won in the final 6–4, 2–6, 6–3 against Capriati.

Seeds
A champion seed is indicated in bold text while text in italics indicates the round in which that seed was eliminated. The top eight seeds received a bye to the second round.

  Martina Hingis (semifinals)
  Venus Williams (third round)
  Jennifer Capriati (final)
  Amélie Mauresmo (champion)
  Amanda Coetzer (quarterfinals)
  Conchita Martínez (quarterfinals)
  Nathalie Tauziat (second round)
  Arantxa Sánchez-Vicario (quarterfinals)
  Magdalena Maleeva (second round)
  Kim Clijsters (first round)
  Mary Pierce (withdrew)
  Chanda Rubin (first round)
  Justine Henin (semifinals)
  Sandrine Testud (third round)
  Magüi Serna (second round)
  Barbara Schett (second round)
  Meghann Shaughnessy (third round)

Draw

Finals

Top half

Section 1

Section 2

Bottom half

Section 3

Section 4

Qualifying

Qualifying seeds

Qualifiers

Qualifying draw

First qualifier

Second qualifier

Third qualifier

Fourth qualifier

Fifth qualifier

Sixth qualifier

Seventh qualifier

Eighth qualifier

Ninth qualifier

Tenth qualifier

Eleventh qualifier

Twelfth qualifier

References

External links
 Official results archive (ITF)
 Official results archive (WTA)

WTA German Open
2001 WTA Tour